Brushvale is an unincorporated community in Wilkin County, in the U.S. state of Minnesota.

History
A post office called Brushvale was established in 1902, and remained in operation until 1954. The community was named for Joseph Brush, the original owner of the town site.

References

Unincorporated communities in Wilkin County, Minnesota
Unincorporated communities in Minnesota